NGC 7552 (also known as IC 5294) is a barred spiral galaxy in the constellation Grus. It is at a distance of circa 60 million light years from Earth, which, given its apparent dimensions, means that NGC 7552 is about 75,000 light years across. It forms with three other spiral galaxies the Grus Quartet.

Observation history 

NGC 7552 was originally discovered and reported in 1826 by James Dunlop and John Herschel added it in the General Catalogue of Nebulae and Clusters as number 3977. However, Lewis Swift reported the galaxy independently in on October 22, 1897, at right ascention 9 arcseconds off the location of the galaxy and was included in Index Catalogue as IC 5294.

Structure 
NGC 7552 is a barred spiral galaxy, with two spiral arms forming an outer pseudo-ring. The galaxy is seen nearly face on, at an inclination of ∼ 28°. 
The one arm is more prominent and the less prominent arm shows no clear continuation with the bar. The bar is dusty, and four huge HII regions are detected in it. The disk features numerous scattered HII regions in an asymmetric pattern.

Starburst ring 
In 1994, Forbes et al. observed a partial starburst ring with 1 kpc radius at Br-gamma with various hot spots. They also detected a small-scale molecular bar and a large reservoir of molecular material, however, no evidence of current activity was detected at the nucleus. The ring is more than 100 parsecs wide.

The ring is brighter north of the nucleus and there is inhabited by the younger star populations.  Brandl et al. detected  in near- and mid-infrared nine prominent structures within the ring they identified as star clusters with stellar ages ranging between 5.5 Myr and 6.3 Myr. These clusters account for the 75% of the bolometric luminosity of the starburst ring, with total luminosity of the clusters 2.1 × 1010 L⊙. 
Numerous supernova remnants have been observed in the ring. Further observations of the galaxy in radio waves showed that NGC 7552 contains three star forming rings of radii 1.0 kpc, 1.9 kpc, and 3.4 kpc as observed by the Very Large Array at 46.9 MHz and the Australia Telescope Compact Array.

Galaxy group 
NGC 7552 belongs in NGC 7582 group, also known as the Grus group. Others members of the group include the spiral galaxies of NGC 7599, NGC 7590, NGC 7582, which along with NGC 7552 form the Grus Quartet. A large tidal extension of HI reaches from NGC 7582 to NGC 7552, which is indicative of interactions between
the group members, yet NGC 7552 does not have highly disturbed morphology.

See also
NGC 1672 - a similar-looking barred spiral galaxy

References

External links 

Barred spiral galaxies
Ring galaxies
Luminous infrared galaxies
Grus (constellation)
7552
IC objects
70884